Vitta meleagris is a species of sea snail, a marine gastropod mollusk in the family Neritidae.

Description

Distribution
This species occurs in rivers of the Dominican Republic.

References

 Eichhorst T.E. (2016). Neritidae of the world. Volume 2. Harxheim: Conchbooks. Pp. 696-1366

External links
 Lamarck, [J.-B. M. de. (1822). Histoire naturelle des animaux sans vertèbres. Tome sixième, 2me partie. Paris: published by the Author, 232 pp]

Neritidae
Gastropods described in 1822